The Tanana Valley State Fair is an annual state fair held in College, Alaska, United States. The event commences on the first Friday in August, and is a major annual event in Interior Alaska.  The fair is held on a hundred-acre plot of land just outside the city limits of Fairbanks, in the approximate center of College Road. The fairgrounds, along with portions of the Creamer's Field Migratory Waterfowl Refuge and surrounding businesses on the north side of College Road, comprise the eastern reaches of the College census-designated place adjacent to Fairbanks.

It features amusement rides, food concessions, competitive exhibits, contests and live performances.  As of the 85th Annual Fair in 2012, an adult day pass cost $10 and season pass cost $35.

History
The Tanana Valley Fair was founded in 1924, making it the oldest state fair in Alaska.  Experimental agronomist George William Gasser  and local real estate businessman and homesteading farmer Harry Markley Badger were instrumental in forming the not-for-profit Tanana Valley Fair Association.  From 1924 to 1951, the fair was held in various locations in downtown Fairbanks.  All fairs since 1952 have been held at the current location, on land which the association originally leased from the University of Alaska. 

In 1936, the Matanuska Valley Fair formed in Palmer. It saw a name change in 1959 to the "Alaska State Fair" when Alaska was upgraded from a territory to a state in the United States of America. That same year, both fairs requested to be the "Official Alaska State Fair." Subsequently, the governor of Alaska determined the fairs would alternate the title with the Tanana Valley State Fair in Fairbanks using the title in even-numbered years and the Alaska State Fair in Palmer using the title in odd-numbered years.   "Tanana Valley State Fair" was adopted as the permanent name of the fair in Fairbanks in 1985.  The Alaska State Fair in Palmer is held annually for about two weeks around the beginning of August.

The Southeast Alaska Fair is held in Haines for four days over the last weekend in July. There are also fairs in Ninilchik and Kodiak in late August and early September, with smaller fairs held in Delta Junction, Kenny Lake and Salcha.

There was no fair in 1942-45 nor 2020.

Years Themes & Color Schemes
 1980 - Parades of People
 1982 - Fun for You in '82
 1983 - Tanana Valley Showcase
 1984 - Silver Salute
 1985 - Alaska: Tomorrow's Adventure
 1986 - "Weather or Not"
 1987 - We the People
 1988 - Fun! Fair! Fairbanks!
 1989 - Here Come the Clowns!
 1990 - Lettuce Entertain Ewe
 1991 - Days of Swine and Roses
 1992 - And the Beet Goes On!
 1993 - 93 Cheers for Volunteers
 1994 - A Ticket to Ride
 1995 - "Education - It's Only Fair"
 1996 - Shake Rattle & Roll
 1997 - Attack of the Killer Cabbages! They're big, they're green, and they're here!
 1998 - Strawberry Fields for Heifer
 1999 - Poultry in Motion
 2000 - Give Peas a Chance
 2001 - 2001: A Fair Oddity
 2002 - There's No Place Like Home
 2003 - Bright Lights Pig City
 2004 - Corn to be Wild (Colors: yellow.)
 2005 - Feast or Salmon
 2006 - Diamonds are Fair-Ever
 2007 - Faster Than a Speeding Pullet
 2008 - Pirates of the Carrots & Beans
 2009 - Tradition is Our Mission
 2010 - Barn in the USA
 2011 - Northern Nights & Midway Lights (80th anniversary!)
 2012 - The Age of Asparagus 
 2013 - Salmon Enchanted Evening (Colors: midnight blue, copper, and silver.)
 2014 - Peonies From Heaven
 2015 - Blue Jeans & Country Dreams
 2016 - Family, Fun, and the Fair
 2017 - Raven About the Fair
 2018 - May The Fair Be with You
 2019 - Love Is A Cattle Field
 2021 – Don't Stop Be-leafing (no 2020 fair)
 2022 - Sheep Herder in Paradise

Farmer's Market
The associated Tanana Valley Farmer's Market was founded in 1978 as a means for fair exhibitors to sell their produce and goods. It is currently open from May to September three days a week.   The market was formerly located on the fairgrounds property, very near to the intersection of College Road and Aurora Drive and the main entrance to the fairgrounds.  The market, including the building housing it, was moved to a site approximately a half-mile (800 m) to the west in 2005.

See also
 Alaska State Fair
 Festival
 State fair

References

External links

 

Alaska
1924 establishments in Alaska
Annual events in Alaska
August events
Festivals in Alaska
Tourist attractions in Fairbanks North Star Borough, Alaska
Festivals established in 1924